The Olduvai Theory states that the current industrial civilization would have a maximum duration of one hundred years, counted from 1930. From 2030 onwards, mankind would gradually return to levels of civilization comparable to those previously experienced, culminating in about a thousand years (3000 AD) in a hunting-based culture, such as existed on Earth three million years ago, when the Oldowan industry developed; hence the name of this theory, put forward by Richard C. Duncan based on his experience in handling energy sources and his love of archaeology.

Originally, the theory was proposed in 1989 under the name "pulse-transient theory". Subsequently, in 1996, its current name was adopted, inspired by the famous archaeological site, but the theory does not rely in any way on data collected at that site. Richard C. Duncan has published several versions since the appearance of his first paper with different parameters and predictions, which has been a source of criticism and controversy.

In 2007, Duncan defined five postulates based on the observation of data on:

 The world energy production per capita.
 Earth carrying capacity.
 The return to the use of coal as a primary source and the peak oil production.
 Migratory movements.
 The stages of energy utilization in the United States.

In 2009, he again publishes an update restating the postulate concerning world energy consumption per capita with respect to OECD countries, where previously he only compared with United States, downplaying the role of emerging economies.

Different people, such as Pedro A. Prieto, based on this and other theories of catastrophic collapse or die-off, have formulated probable scenarios with various dates and social events. On the other hand, there is a group of people, such as Richard Heinberg or Jared Diamond, who also believe in social collapse, but still visualize the possibility of more benevolent scenarios where degrowth can occur with continued welfare.

This theory has been criticized for the way in which the problem of migratory movements is posed and for the ideological orientation of the publishing house that published its articles, The Social Contract Press, which is an advocate of anti-immigration measures and birth control. There are major criticisms on each of the argumentative bases and different ideologies contrary to such approaches such as the Cornucopians, the advocates of the natural resource-based economy, environmentalist positions and the positions of various nations also fail to establish a consistent basis for such claims.

History 
Richard C. Duncan is an author who first proposed Olduvai's theory in 1989 under the title "The pulse-transient theory of industrial civilization." Later this theory was supplemented in 1993 with the article "The life-expectancy of industrial civilization: The decline to global equilibrium."

In June 1996, Duncan presented a paper titled "The Olduvai theory: falling towards a post-industrial stone-age era", adopting the term "Olduvai theory" in place of "pulse-transient theory" used in earlier work. Duncan published a more updated version of his theory under the name "The Peak Of World Oil Production And The Road To The Olduvai Gorge" at the 2000 Symposium Summit of the Geological Society of America on November 13, 2000. In 2005, Duncan extended the data set within his theory to 2003 in the article "The Olduvai Theory: Energy, Population, and Industrial Civilization."

Description 
The Olduvai theory is a model that is mainly based on the peak oil theory and the per capita energy yield of oil. In the face of a foreseeable depletion, it establishes that the rate of energy consumption and world population growth cannot be the same as that of the 20th century.

Put differently, Olduvai's theory is defined by the rise and fall of the material quality of life (MQOL) which consists of the rate resulting from the increase or decrease of the production, use and consumption of energy sources (E) between the growth of the world population (P), (MQOL = E/P). From 1954 to 1979 that rate grew annually by about 2.8 %, from that date to 2000 it increased erratically by 0.2 % per year. From 2000 to 2007 it grew again at an exponential rate due to the development of emerging economies.

In works prior to 2000, Richard C. Duncan considered the peak of per capita energy consumption in 1979 as the peak of civilization. Currently, due to the growth since 2000 of the emerging economies, he considers 2010 as the likely date of peak energy per capita. But despite that adjustment, he continues to claim that in 2030 that rate of energy production per capita would be similar to that of 1930, considering that date as the end of the current civilization.

The theory argues that the first reliable signs of collapse are likely to consist of a series of widespread blackouts in the developed world. With the lack of electrical power and fossil fuels, there will be a transition from today's civilization to a situation close to that of the pre-industrial era. He goes on to argue that in events following that collapse the technological level is expected to eventually move from Dark Ages-like levels to those observed in the Stone Age within approximately three thousand years.

Duncan takes as a basis for the formulation of his theory data consisting of the following facts:

 Data obtained on world energy production per capita.
 The development of population from 1850 to 2005.
 The carrying capacity of the Earth in the absence of oil.
 Energy utilization stages and their level of growth in United States anticipate global ones, due to their dominance.
 Estimation of the year 2007 as the time of the peak oil.
 Migratory movements or attractiveness principle.

According to Duncan, the theory has five postulates:

 The exponential growth of world energy production ended in 1970.
 The intervals of growth, stagnation and final decline of energy production per capita in the United States anticipate the intervals of energy production per capita in the rest of the world. In such intervals there is a shift from oil to coal as the primary energy source.
 The final decline of industrial civilization will begin around 2008-2012.
 Partial and total blackouts will be reliable indicators of terminal or final decline.
 World population will decline in line with world energy production per capita.

Bases for the formulation of the theory

Carrying capacity limit and demographic explosion 

He stipulates that the real capacity of the Earth without oil in the long run is between 500 and 2000 million people, which has been exceeded by a factor of three thanks to an artificial welfare bubble due to cheap oil. He argues that since the homeostatic balance of the Earth is around at most 2 billion people, as oil runs out at least 4 billion people will not be able to be regulated by the system, resulting in a large mortality rate.

Prior to 1800 the world population was doubling at a rate of between 500 and 1000 years, and by that date the world population was just under 1 billion. With the first industrial revolution and colonialism, the population in the Western world began to double at a rate just over 100 years, with the rest of the world following soon after, with 1550 million inhabitants by 1900. With the second industrial revolution the world began to double at a rate of less than 100 years, and with oil production and the digital revolution it doubled at a rate of about 50 years, from 2.4 billion people in 1950 to 6070 million people in 2000.

The theory not only predicts that the Earth's net load does not allow for the rate of such growth but that its population already exceeded its capacity after 1925. Thus one can see an apocalyptic scenario where the population would slow down in 2012 due to sudden global economic decline and peak in 2015 at around 6900 million (see critiques section), and would never in history grow to these levels again, there being as many deaths as births at any given time (1:1), roughly around the year 2017 or so. Thereafter the number of deaths would exceed the number of births (>1:1) and the world population would begin to contract dramatically with approximately 6.8 billion people remaining by the end of 2020, 6500 million by 2025, 5260 million by 2027, 4600 million by 2030 (reduction between 1800 and 2000 million people in 5 years), until the number of humans stabilizes at a figure between 2000 and 500 million inhabitants at a point between the years 2050 and 2100.

Duncan compares the forecast of his theory with that of Dennis Meadows in his book "The Limits to Growth". While Duncan expects the peak population in 2015 to be around 6.9 billion, Meadows expects the peak in 2027 to be around 7.47 billion. In addition, Duncan forecasts only 2000 million inhabitants by 2050, while Meadows estimates 6450 million inhabitants by 2050.

Other estimates similar to Olduvai's theory predict that the population will reach a zenith around the year 2025-2030 reaching a number between 7100 and 8000 million inhabitants and thereafter the population will decrease at the same rate it grew before the zenith describing a symmetric Gaussian bell.

Scholars, such as Paul Chefurka, point out that the Earth's carrying capacity will be defined both by factors such as the level of damage caused to ecosystems during the industrial period (pollution, alterations and even depletion of ecosystems, highly polluting and long-lasting waste and destruction of resources due to possible competition for them), the development of alternative technologies or oil substitutes and the existence of knowledge that would allow the survival of the remaining population in a sustainable manner (such as the rescue of traditional ways of life prior to the industrial revolution).

Principle of attractiveness 

The formulation of this basis, supported on the work on the dynamics of complex social systems by Jay W. Forrester, proposes that the variables of per capita natural resource and material standard of living are subordinated to the per capita energy yield of oil. This principle holds that attractiveness is the difference in material standard of living between nations. Thus the US material standard of living in 2005 was 57.7 barrels of oil equivalent (BOE) per capita while the material standard of living of the rest of the world was 9.8 BOE per capita, there being a difference in consumption of 47.9 BOE equivalent per capita. Put another way, the huge difference in lifestyle and consumption becomes attractive to immigrants.

The new immigrant, upon arriving in that society, adopts the same consumerist lifestyle, further overloading that system. Duncan argues that the greater the immigration the greater the number of population where the differences in the material standard of living of the attracting country will diminish in an equalizing process until that country reaches the world's material standard of living.

This proposition has already been criticized in several parts of the world, because although Duncan insinuates that borders should be closed, he does not stop to consider that the main cause of resource depletion is the consumerist and predatory lifestyle of these attractive countries (see critiques section).

Return to the use of coal as a primary source 

The theory proposes that due to the predominance of one nation the rest of the world will follow the same sequence in the implementation of a resource as a primary source. It thus comparatively analyzes a chronology of resource utilization as a primary source between United States and the rest of the world:

Utilization of biomass as a primary source.
 In the United States until 1886.
 In the rest of the world until 1900.

Use of coal as primary source.
 In the United States from 1886 to 1951.
 In the rest of the world from 1900 to 1963.

Use of oil as primary source.
 In the United States from 1951 to 1986.
 In the rest of the world from 1963 to 2005.

Return to the use of coal as primary source.
 In the United States since 1986.
 In the rest of the world from 2005.

According to Duncan, from 2000 to 2005 while world coal production increased by 4.8 % per year, oil increased by just 1.6 %.

The return to coal as a primary source, another taboo fact due to its high level of pollution, has been muted in the media as has the carrying capacity of the Earth for obvious political reasons, Duncan says.

Energy consumption of the population 

Just as the shift from oil to coal as a primary source in the U.S. is marking global changes in advance, the indicator of the level of per capita energy consumption and production over time in the U.S. is also marking that of the rest of the world. Thus, Duncan distinguishes three stages in U.S. consumption that were subsequently reflected in world consumption:

Growth 
 1945-1970: U.S. growth stage, average growth of 1.4 % per capita energy production per year is observed during the period.
 1954-1979: World growth stage, an average growth of 2.8 % per capita energy production per year is observed during the period.

Stagnation 
 1970-1998: U.S. stagnation stage, average decline of 0.6 % p.a. of energy production per capita during the period.
 1979-2008: A period of global stagnation, an average growth of 0.2 % per capita energy production per year is observed during the period, after 2000 an upturn is observed due to the growth of emerging economies.

Final decline or decay 
 1998 onwards: US final decline stage, an average decline of 1.8 % per year of energy production per capita is observed during the period 1998-2005.
 2008-2012 onwards: Probable stage of final global decline. The development of emerging economies and the huge coal utilization in China may slow down this process until 2012.

Theory updates

2009 update 
After criticism received for the discrepancy shown by the United States per capita energy consumption curve, which tends to decrease, with respect to the world curve, which has tended to increase extraordinarily after 2000, Duncan published an update in 2009 of his theory where he compares a curve of the OECD members (30 countries) relative to the curve of the rest of the non-OECD world (165 countries) in which Brazil, India, and China are included.

In this new paper on the various peaks of per capita energy consumption in the world Duncan concludes the following:
 1973: Peak per capita energy in United States.
 2005: Peak energy per capita in OECD countries at around 4.75 tonnes of oil equivalent (toe) per capita.
 2008: After having increased from 2000 to 2007 the per capita consumption of non-OECD countries by 28 %, the composite leading indicator of China, India and Brazil declined sharply in 2008, leading him to conclude that the average standard of living in non-OECD countries has already begun to fall. However, a February 2010 OECD report appears to contradict this claim (see critiques section).
 2010: Most likely date of peak energy per capita globally.

In this new scenario it forecasts that the United States average standard of living or energy per capita would fall by 90 % between 2008 and 2030, OECD levels would fall by 86 % and the level of non-OECD countries would fall by 60 %. The average standard of living in the OECD would catch up with the average level of the rest of the world by 2030 standing at 3.53 barrels of oil equivalent per capita.

Societal scenarios according to the theory 
Pedro A. Prieto, one of the Spanish-language specialists on the subject, has gone so far as to outline a probable scenario of societal collapse based on aspects of this theory.

Crisis of the Nation State 
Wealthy nations would suffer increased insecurity, and what had been democratic societies would become totalitarian and ultraconservative societies where the population itself would demand outside resources and increased security. It is possible that before the great final die-off large developed nations would dispute scarce resources in a sort of World War III, without ruling out scenarios similar to the final solution or nuclear war.Others argue that such a war, if it were to happen, would be an intercapitalist war involving three blocks of civilizations. The first would be constituted by the Western civilization, the second by the Orthodox civilization as well as Sinic, and a third block formed by the Islamic civilization. Japan and India would play a major role in such a war as they define their position.

In the event that some nations survived, lack of resources could trigger famines in large urban centers forcing widespread looting and governments would issue decrees and martial laws restricting social freedoms and eliminating property rights to keep the starving population at bay. In the face of permanent shortages, governments would impose rationing that would fall short of the required minimums which would cause the very ones imposing force to plunder for their own profit, this would be the first symptom of the fading of the states.

The financial system would succumb, money would be momentarily replaced by precious metals, but these would eventually become worthless as well, and it would be time for "my kingdom for a horse". This is the point at which many have predicted that "an off-road vehicle would be exchanged for a loaf of bread". The dominant minorities and military forces would plunder for themselves, and form small dictatorships and kingdoms within what were once great nations. On the other hand, from the "great masses of the disinherited" would form disorganized groups of a very unstable character that would act violently and chaotically to take scarce resources. Between one and the other the conflict would be served and in the end both would succumb like the rest of the population.

Survivor's profile 
It is estimated that cities with more than twenty thousand inhabitants would be very unstable, having better life expectancy in the first place those societies of hunters and gatherers in the Amazon, the Central African jungles, those of Southeast Asia, the Bushmen, and the aborigines in Australia. In second place of survival would be the fairly homogeneous nuclei of three hundred to two thousand inhabitants with an agricultural lifestyle close to places with uncontaminated water resources, inaccessible and hundreds of kilometers away from the large cities and from the hordes of starving people that would exude these cities or from the decaying military forces that would engage in looting.

In the end there could also be a huge number of small agricultural villages vying for the few privileged places, with only those villages surviving that the land carrying capacity would allow.

Other visions 
Pedro A. Prieto himself speculates that war scenarios similar to World War III or other types of destructive war conflicts would be less likely to occur if the social collapse is rapid, such as the one predicted by Olduvai's theory. The difference between scenarios is that the majority of the population, contained in the cities, dies of famine in the rapid collapse, while in the slow collapse the war would spread to the safest areas, ranging from large cities to small, isolated rural communities.

The conjectures of those who opine on the possibility of a post-industrial era are spread across a spectrum ranging from scenarios of rapid and catastrophic social collapse to scenarios of slow and benevolent collapse, and even scenarios where they still envision degrowths with continued welfare.

Catastrophic collapse or die-off 
In the first group, the pessimists, is framed the same Olduvai theory of Duncan and other works such as the die-off or catastrophic collapse proposed by David Price, Reg Morrison and Jay Hanson. They usually invoke a number of determinisms such as strong, genetic, and energetic determinism (Leslie A. White's Basic Law of Evolution) to announce the inevitable collapse that will lead to the decomposition of civilized life ruling out the possibility of a peaceful decline.

Smooth decline or "prosperous downhill path" 
Among those who predict slow and benevolent collapse scenarios where the degrowth option with continuity of the welfare state we can mention the "prosperous way downhill" of Elizabeth and Howard T. Odum, the end of suburbanization and the return to ruralization proposed by James Howard Kunstler, societies that can still choose to save themselves or fail proposed by Jared Diamond and Richard Heinberg's "gradual shutdown" option.

Heinberg, in his book "Shutdown: Options and Actions in a Post-Coal World", proposes the four possible paths that nations could take in the face of coal and oil depletion:
 "Last one and we're out" or "last one standing": Scenario where there is fierce global competition for the remaining resources.
 "Gradual shutdown": Where there is global cooperation in reducing energy use, conservation, sound water management, and global population reduction.
 "Denial": Posture in the hopes that some unforeseen element or serendipity will solve the problem (see also black swan theory).
 "Life-saving community": Preparing local areas in a sustainable way in the event that the global economic project collapses.

The renaissance of utopias 
These are visions where collapse is both an outcome and an objective. As in the 19th century, and at the beginning of the industrial era, romanticism and the utopian movements arose, again and in the face of the prediction of a collapse of the industrial era, a new hatching of utopian visions is registered. This renaissance advances in the opposite direction to the decline of sociological theories which can no longer provide adequate solutions due to the translimitation situation.

For Joseph Tainter, a collapsing complex society is suddenly smaller, simpler, less stratified and with fewer social differences. This situation, according to Theodore Roszak, evokes the utopian dogma of the old environmentalist program of reducing, slowing down, democratizing and decentralizing.

According to Ernest Garcia, many of these proponents are scientists engaged in areas ranging from the ecologist discipline to geology, computer science, biochemistry and evolutionary genetics, far removed from the study of the social sciences. Among the most palpable recent utopian movements are anarchoprimitivism, deep ecology, and techno-utopias such as transhumanism.

Critiques and positions on the theory

Criticism of the basis of the argument

Criticism of the limit of carrying capacity and population explosion 

This forecast also differs from that of a 2004 United Nations report where estimates of world population development from 1800 to 2300 were calculated, with the worst-case scenario being that where world population reaches a peak of 7500 million between 2035-2040, subsequently reducing to 7000 million by 2065, 6000 million by 2090 and 5500 million approximately by the year 2100.

A report issued in 2011 by the United Nations Population Division states that on October 31, 2011 officially the world's population would reach 7 billion and in the year 2019 it was estimated a total population of 7.8 billion people. All contradicting Duncan's estimate that by 2015 there would be around 6.9 billion humans in the world population. However, recent times have seen a decline in population growth, albeit due to the increasingly common decision to have fewer children or discard parenthood due to cultural and social factors rather than the deaths caused by famine and disease mentioned in the theory. Because of these factors China abolished its one-child policy and in several places around the world their governments offer incentives to have children.

Criticism of the principle of attractiveness 
Of the critics who object to some point of the theory, those who criticize the xenophobic and racist cultural biases that are reflected to a greater extent on the principle of attractiveness stand out. Pedro A. Prieto criticizes the proposal of closing borders to immigrants, but not the closure to the entry of depredated resources that end up serving the high US consumption. Nevertheless, he concludes that the more general tenets of the theory such as peak oil, land carrying capacity, and a return to coal as a primary source are feasible to some degree.

Many of Richard C. Duncan's works have been published in The Social Contract Press, an American publishing house founded by John Tanton and directed by Wayne Lutton. This publishing house is an advocate of birth control and the reduction of immigration, as well as emphasizing issues such as culture and the environment covering everything from the point of view of the political right. Among its most controversial publications is the book "The Camp of the Saints" by French author Jean Raspail, causing such publisher to be described by the Southern Poverty Law Center as a "hate group" that "publishes a series of racist works."

Critics of the peak oil estimate 

There are positions that speak from the peak oil theory may be a hoax, as argued by Lindsey Williams (2006), to that of different governments, social organizations or private companies that predict the peak at dates ranging from two years before to forty years after the date proposed by Duncan and with very different behaviors in the production curve.

The abiogenic petroleum origin theory argument, proposed since the 19th century, holds that natural petroleum formed in deep coal deposits, perhaps dating back to the formation of the Earth. This would therefore prove that fossil fuel reserves are more numerous, according to geophysicist Alexander Goncharov of the Carnegie Institution in Washington, who simulated in 2009 the conditions of the mantle with a diamond probe and a laser creating from methane other molecules such as ethane, propane, butane, molecular hydrogen and graphite. Goncharov says all estimates of peak to date have been wrong, so believing in peak oil is unreliable and asserts that oil companies could look for new abiotic deposits.

Criticism of the return to coal 

Another data that can be observed and that does not correspond with the prediction that coal replaced oil in 2005 differs from other reports such as the EDRO website, where for the year 2006 oil still represented 35.27 % as a source of consumption, while coal still represented 28.02 %, although the same page admits the increasing use of coal over oil. Similarly on the BP Global page, in its energy graphs tool mode, it can be seen that within the year 2007 oil consumption had a slight decrease from 3939.4 Mtoe to 3927.9 Mtoe. Yet coal consumption during the same period rose from 3194.5 Mtoe to 3303.7 Mtoe.

Another position is that the theory of climate change caused by human emissions of greenhouse gases is erroneous, since the cause of such warming is actually due to variations in solar activity. Therefore, the progressive increase in carbon production and consumption will replace oil without environmental or economic consequences in a way that justifies the way China and United States are acting.

Critiques on per capita energy consumption 

Duncan's articles assume that peak per capita energy was 11.15 bep/c/yr in 1979, but other data from the U.S. Department of Energy (EIA) show that since that date there has been an increase in that figure to 12.12 bep/c/yr after 2004. Which is in contradiction with the postulate of the theory that energy per capita does not grow exponentially from 1979 to 2008.

TheOilDrum.com page argues that a true peak in per capita energy consumption of around 12.50 bep/year was observed between 2004 and 2005 based on data from the United Nations, British Petroleum and the International Energy Agency. These proponents mention that Duncan relied primarily on per capita energy consumption of oil, but with notable omissions of the growth in per capita energy consumption of coal since 2000, attributed to the Asian emergency, and of the uninterrupted growth of natural gas since 1965.

They point out that the civilizational peak was not in 1979 but at a date after 2004 and with a duration of industrial civilization between 1950 and 2044. They also add that if other resources are not so dependent on the behavior of oil consumption probably the civilizational duration will be much longer than a hundred years.

After the reliability of the postulate that the rest of the world was following in the footsteps of the United States in the behavior of per capita energy consumption dynamics was challenged, in 2009 he published a new article called "Olduvai's Theory: Towards the Re-Equalization of the World Standard of Living", in which he compared the behavior of world per capita consumption with that of the most developed countries (OECD). In that article, based on a March 2009 OECD report of the composite leading indicator for China, India and Brazil, he claims that world per capita energy consumption would start to decline, however, a new OECD composite leading indicator report in February 2010 sees a huge recovery, which contradicts Duncan's assertion.

Political and ideological criticisms

Ecologist criticism 

Social ecologists and international associations such as Greenpeace are more optimistic, pinning their hopes on the alternative energies that neo-Malthusians despise such as geothermal energy, solar energy, wind energy and others with low or no pollution, but reject fusion energy, as they consider it potentially polluting. They say that data such as population growth are counted without taking into account the scenarios opened up by the large number of social and technological changes to solve problems, such as alternative energies and radical changes in lifestyle that can reduce the effects that such a theory predicts. In contrast, market ecologists claim that such changes will occur by forcing them on consumers through the use of the laws of supply and demand.

Meanwhile, anarcho-primitivists and deep ecologists see this catastrophist scenario as a painful path to which civilization is leading us. Thus, they tend to see civilizational collapse as an inevitable outcome as much as a goal to be reached.

Left-wing criticism 
Some libertarians, anarchists and socialists think that this type of theories are lies or exaggerations that benefit economic speculation, and that they basically have the purpose of selling more expensive an easily controllable resource that apparently is depleted or scarce, to perpetuate the free market game and the ruling classes.

Jacque Fresco mentions that energy resources are not only inappropriate, but also that there are other very abundant energy sources that the social elites could not easily control because they are not speculable, since their reserves would be virtually inexhaustible in a period of no less than 4000 years at the current rate of consumption, and this is only counting the case of geothermal energy.

He has also created The Venus Project in supposed opposition to the current capitalist economic model based on monetary gain.

Already some time ago there was a wide movement on the web to check the movement and, above all, the figure of Jacques Fresco. From the results we can infer a possible fraud on Jacques Fresco's shares.

In the meantime, authors such as Peter Lindemann or Jeane Manning, add that there are a number of alternatives for obtaining and distributing energy freely, which if employed, would end the capitalist model of hoarding procurement and distribution. This has led them to formulate a conspiracy theory for the suppression of free energy. Prominent among such forms of free and free energy distribution is the wireless power transfer devised by Nikola Tesla.

In turn, all authors of such arguments about alleged conspiracies, see as an agenda of the elitists the formulations of peak oil, warmongering ideas, catastrophism and neo-Malthusianism.

Right-wing criticism 
Cornucopians are libertarians who argue that population growth, resource scarcity and its polluting potential are exaggerations or lies, such as peak oil or the devastating environmental effect of coal. They argue that the same laws of the market would solve such problems, if they were real.

The main theses defended by cornucopians are usually optimistic and pragmatic. Meanwhile others consider them conservative, moralistic and exclusionary. These theses consist of the following points:
 Technological progress equals environmental progress. Environmental deterioration is minimized as technologies appear that use resources cleanly and efficiently.
 Anti-environmentalism. They criticize catastrophist positions, such as Olduvai's theory, for being based on inadequate models that produce precarious scenarios that do not portray economic dynamics in their historical perspective. They reject the idea of degrowth because it goes against technological and, in turn, environmental progress.
 Technological optimism. Technological progress continually invents energy substitutes before a resource is exhausted. In this way man since the Neolithic has continually exceeded the earth load by moving from one technology or energy source to another. Also the availability and efficiency of land for food production increases with the use of new and efficient technologies such as better agrochemicals, pesticides and genetic manipulation.
 Growth is green. Economic growth solves all problems, i.e., it is poverty and not wealth that degrades and misuses the environment.
 Reliance on the free market. The creation of new forms of ownership and new markets exerts pressures to switch from one technology or energy source to another through the use of economic speculation. For this reason, Cornucopians do not approve of State intervention.
 Abolition of birth control. They argue that for every new mouth that demands resources for its nourishment, a brain and a pair of hands are also born, contributing to technological progress. In other words, contrary to what neo-Malthusians think, population is seen as a resource that far from causing problems solves them.
 Defense by the anthropocentric aesthetic value of resources rather than by their future value.

Criticism and national positions 

Conservatives, traditionalists and nationalists focus their positions only on temporal benefit from the ethnocentric or anthropocentric point of view without accounting for adverse effects to the environment, and do not usually outright deny peak oil or Olduvai's theory, but usually omit some points or all of the theory as a form of institutional denial. It is easy, and in fact according to theory, it predicts that most countries in the world will take this line and move from oil to coal or nuclear power like United States or China without caring about the social or ecological consequences.

An argument in favor of the positions of the various countries, especially China and the United States, is that while there is a shift from oil to coal, coal is beginning to be used in a non-polluting way through integrated gasification combined cycle, although their rate of energy return may be lower than doing it in a polluting way.

Another argument in favor is the cooperation of China, India, Japan, United States and Europe in the ITER project to demonstrate the scientific and technological feasibility of nuclear fusion, although participation from some countries has been intermittent.

If fusion energy were possible, the energy potential of the deuterium contained in all the planet's seas, rivers and lakes would be equivalent to approximately 1,068 x 109 times the world's oil reserves in 2009, i.e., each cubic meter of water on land would be equivalent to 150 tonnes of oil in energy content.

At the world "consumption rate" of 2007 this would equate to an approximate duration of 17.5 billion years of modern industrial civilization before this resource could be exhausted assuming a constant population of 6.5 billion people not growing and no economic growth. In reality the current system is based on economic, productive, demographic, material or energy growth and this growth rate is usually measured on an annualized basis. For example, at a growth rate of 2 % per year the energy consumption of oil would be doubling every 34.65 years and, at the end of 1220 years, as much energy would be consumed as is available in all the seas in the form of deuterium to perform nuclear fusion. At a growth rate of 5 % per year all the deuterium would be used up in 488 years, and at a growth rate of 11.4 % per year in only 214 years.

Some positions and several developed countries have opted for the non-anthropogenic global warming or solar origin version, seeing the environmentalist warnings as an exaggeration. Other countries, the Third World countries, see the depletion theories and the international environmental agreements as measures imposed by the First World countries to curb their development.

See also 
 Malthusian catastrophe
 Climate change
 Doomsday argument
 Societal collapse

Notes

References

Bibliography 
 
 
 
 
 
 
 
 
 
 
 
 

Futurism
Conspiracy theories
Peak oil
World population
Energy consumption
Energy sources